Pantoea stewartii is a species of plant pathogenic bacteria that causes Stewart's wilt of corn, as well as jackfruit-bronzing disease, bacterial leaf wilt of sugarcane, and leaf blight in rice. P. stewartii is a gram-negative bacterium in the Enterobacterales, a group that also includes Escherichia coli and several other human, animal, and plant pathogens. Most research on this bacterial pathogen to date has been done on strains infecting corn as the other diseases have been identified much more recently. Due to being relatively easy to work with in laboratory research, P. stewartii has been used to study a range of processes in bacterial physiology including quorum sensing, bacterial pigment production, endoglucanase enzymes, and siderophore-mediated iron acquisition.

References 

Bacterial plant pathogens and diseases
Maize diseases
Enterobacterales